Bertrand Visage is a French academic and writer.

He was a Professor of Literature in France for 3 years before moving to Italy to teach French literature for 2 years at the University of Catania in Sicily and afterwards at Naples Eastern University. Following a 2 years residence at the French Academy in Rome at the Villa Medici, he returned to Palermo, Sicily as a cultural attaché at the French Embassy. From 1987 to 1992 he taught French literature at the University of Rome and at the University of Naples.

His novels Tous les soleils and Angelica were both set in Sicily. Tous les soleils won the Prix Femina in 1984 and Angelica the Albert Camus Prize in 1988.

In 1983 he had won the Fénéon Prize for his earlier novel Au pays des nains

References

Living people
20th-century French novelists
21st-century French novelists
Prix Femina winners
1952 births
French male novelists
Prix Fénéon winners
20th-century French male writers
21st-century French male writers
Nouvelle Revue Française editors